Lisa Randall  (born June 18, 1962) is an American theoretical physicist and Frank B. Baird, Jr. Professor of Science at Harvard University. Her research includes the fundamental forces of nature and dimensions of space.  She studies the Standard Model, supersymmetry, possible solutions to the hierarchy problem concerning the relative weakness of gravity, cosmology of dimensions, baryogenesis, cosmological inflation, and dark matter. She contributed to the Randall–Sundrum model, first published in 1999 with Raman Sundrum.

Early life and education
Randall was born in Queens, New York City, New York.  An alumna of Hampshire College Summer Studies in Mathematics, she graduated from Stuyvesant High School in 1980, where she was a classmate of fellow physicist and science popularizer Brian Greene. She won first place in the 1980 Westinghouse Science Talent Search at the age of 18 and was also named a National Merit Scholar. She attended Harvard University, where she took Math 55, earned a BA in physics in 1983 and a PhD in theoretical particle physics in 1987 under Howard Georgi.

Academia
Randall researches particle physics and cosmology at Harvard, where she is a professor of theoretical physics. Her research concerns elementary particles and fundamental forces, and has involved the study of a wide variety of models, the most recent involving dimensions. She has also worked on supersymmetry, Standard Model observables, cosmological inflation, baryogenesis, grand unified theories, and general relativity.

After her graduate work at Harvard, Randall held professorships at MIT and Princeton University before returning to Harvard in 2001.  Professor Randall was the first tenured woman in the Princeton physics department and the first tenured female theoretical physicist at Harvard. (Melissa Franklin was the first tenured woman in the Harvard physics department.)

Writing 
Randall's books Warped Passages: Unraveling the Mysteries of the Universe's Hidden Dimensions and Knocking on Heaven’s Door: How Physics and Scientific Thinking Illuminate the Universe and the Modern World have both been on New York Times 100 notable books lists.

Between the hardback and paperback release of Knocking on Heaven's Door, the quest for the discovery of the Higgs boson was actually completed, a subject discussed in the book. Scientists at the Large Hadron Collider found a particle identified as the Higgs boson.  She said about the discovery, that even if people don't understand everything about it, "what an exciting thing it is that people are excited that there is something fundamentally new that has been discovered."  Randall has an e-book entitled Higgs Discovery: The Power of Empty Space.  Before the Large Hadron Collider was operating, she wrote an article explaining the discoveries that were expected from using it.  She was commonly asked about the misconception that the LHC could make black holes that could destroy the planet.  She answered that it was "not even conceivable unless space and gravity are very different from what we thought."

Randall wrote the libretto of the opera Hypermusic Prologue: A Projective Opera in Seven Planes on the invitation of the composer, Hèctor Parra, who was inspired by her book Warped Passages.

Professional organizations
Randall is a member of the American Academy of Arts and Sciences (2004) and the National Academy of Sciences (2008), the American Philosophical Society, and a fellow of the American Physical Society.

Randall has helped organize numerous conferences and has been on the editorial board of several major theoretical physics journals.

Awards and honors
In autumn 2004, she was the most cited theoretical physicist of the previous five years. Professor Randall was featured in Seed magazine's "2005 Year in Science Icons" and in Newsweeks "Who's Next in 2006" as "one of the most promising theoretical physicists of her generation". In 2007, Randall was named one of Time magazine's 100 Most Influential People (Time 100) under the section for "Scientists & Thinkers". Randall was given this honor for her work regarding the evidence of a higher dimension.

Other honors:
J.J. Sakurai Prize for Theoretical Particle Physics 2019
Andrew Gemant Award, 2012
Golden Plate Award of the American Academy of Achievement, 2008
Lilienfeld Prize, 2007
E. A. Wood Science Writing Award, 2007
Klopsteg Memorial Award from the American Association of Physics Teachers (AAPT), 2006
Premio Caterina Tomassoni e Felice Pietro Chisesi, from the Sapienza University of Rome, 2003
National Science Foundation Young Investigator Award, 1992

Personal life
In an interview she was asked whether she believes in God, she said:

"... I probably don't believe in God. I think it's a problem that people are considered immoral if they're not religious. That's just not true. This might earn me some enemies, but in some ways they may be even more moral. If you do something for a religious reason, you do it because you'll be rewarded in an afterlife or in this world. That's not quite as good as something you do for purely generous reasons."

Randall's sister, Dana Randall, is a professor of computer science at Georgia Tech.

Bibliography

References

External links 

Professor Randall's website at Harvard
Reprinted Op-Ed from The New York Times of Sunday, September 18, 2005
Lisa Randall's Bio Page, Edge Foundation
On Gravity, Oreos and a Theory of Everything (New York Times, November 1, 2005)
 (archived from Radio Interview) from This Week in Science May 9, 2006 Broadcast
Profile in Scientific American, October 2005

Lisa Randall is interviewed by Charlie Rose

1962 births
Living people
American atheists
Particle physicists
American string theorists
American women physicists
Fellows of the American Academy of Arts and Sciences
Fellows of the American Physical Society
Members of the United States National Academy of Sciences
Harvard University faculty
Massachusetts Institute of Technology faculty
Princeton University faculty
Harvard University alumni
Stuyvesant High School alumni
People from Queens, New York
21st-century American physicists
20th-century American physicists
21st-century American women scientists
20th-century American women scientists
Scientists from New York City
MIT Center for Theoretical Physics faculty
J. J. Sakurai Prize for Theoretical Particle Physics recipients
American women academics
Cosmologists
Theoretical physicists
Scientific American people